Hochstadt is a district of the city of Maintal in Hesse, Germany.

History 
Hochstadt's existence was first documented in the year 846.
 
In 1974 Hochstadt lost its independence and merged with three other towns, Bischofsheim, Dörnigheim and Wachenbuchen, a district of the newly formed city of Maintal.

Main-Kinzig-Kreis